Chaudhary Ajit Singh (12 February 1939 – 6 May 2021) was an Indian politician. He was a big Jat community leader. He was the founder and chief of the Rashtriya Lok Dal, a political party recognized in western part of state of Uttar Pradesh, and son of former Prime Minister of India late Chaudhary Charan Singh. He had tested positive for COVID-19 on 22 April 2021 and was admitted in a Gurugram hospital. He died on 6 May 2021 after his condition deteriorated.

Political career
Chaudhary Ajit Singh was one of the most dynamic leaders of India, especially worked for farmers and on economic condition of India. When Chaudhary Ajit Singh was Commerce and Industry Minister in V. P. Singh's government, he drafted and tried to pass the bill against License Raj, which was unsuccessful since most of the parties were against it. When Chandra Shekhar Government fell, prime minister P.V Narasimha Rao and Finance Minister Manmohan Singh passed the same bill in the Parliament. This bill was one of the major reforms of Indian history better known as the Liberalization reforms of India, which opened the country for the Global market.

Ajit Singh entered into politics in May 1986 by joining Lok Dal. He was made general secretary and a member of central parliamentary board of Lok Dal. Within months of joining politics, he removed Mulayam Singh Yadav from the position of Lok Dal legislature party leader in Uttar Pradesh Legislative Assembly.

Ajit Singh was first elected to Rajya Sabha (the upper house of Indian Parliament) in 1986 after his father and former prime minister Charan Singh became ill. He was the President of Lok Dal (A). In 1988, he merged Lok Dal (A) with Janata Party and became president of Janata Party. In 1989, he was General Secretary of Janata Dal after all the parties decided to merge under the leadership of VP Singh to take on the Indian National Congress. Ajit Singh brought in most political strength from Uttar Pradesh to VP Singh during that election. At several occasions, Ajit Singh was a significant political figure in government formations as well as in alliances. One of the important movements was when Ajit Singh even threatened to leave the P.V. Narsimharao government because Manmohan Singh, the Finance Minister of India wanted to put the Indian farmers to also pay income tax, of which Chaudhary believed will destroy the Indian Farmers.

He was elected to Lok Sabha (the lower house of Indian Parliament) from Baghpat in 1989. He was Minister of Industry in V. P. Singh's cabinet from December 1989 to November 1990. He was re-elected to Lok Sabha in 1991 Indian general election. He served as Minister of Food in P. V. Narasimha Rao's cabinet.

Ajit Singh was re-elected in 1996 as a Congress candidate but resigned from the party and Lok Sabha in 1996. He then founded Bharatiya Kisan Kamgar Party and was re-elected in a Baghpat 1997 by-election. In 1999, he relaunched his party with the name Rashtriya Lok Dal. He lost the 1998 election and was re-elected in 1999, 2004 and 2009. From 2001 to 2003, he was Minister of Agriculture in Atal Bihari Vajpayee's government. After his party joined the ruling United Progressive Alliance in 2011, he was Minister of Civil Aviation from December 2011 to May 2014. In 2019 Indian general election, He contested from Muzaffarnagar but  lost to Sanjeev Balyan of BJP by a very small margin of 6526 votes.

Education
He had a Bachelor of Technology (Mechanical Engineering) from IIT Kharagpur and an M.S. from Illinois Institute of Technology. He was a computer scientist by profession and one of the first Indians to work with IBM in the 1960s.

Personal life
He was married to Radhika Singh, and had one son and two daughters. His son, Jayant Chaudhary, was a member of the 15th Lok Sabha from Mathura, Uttar Pradesh.

Death 
Singh tested positive for COVID-19 on 20 April 2021 and was admitted in a private hospital in Gurugram. He died on 6 May 2021 after developing COVID-19. At the time of death, he was 82 years old.

See also
Janata Dal (Ajit)

References

|-

|-

|-

|-

|-

External links
 Official biographical sketch in Parliament of India website

1939 births
2021 deaths
People from Baghpat
IIT Kharagpur alumni
Illinois Institute of Technology alumni
Children of prime ministers of India
Rashtriya Lok Dal politicians
Janata Dal politicians
V. P. Singh administration
Rajya Sabha members from Uttar Pradesh
India MPs 1989–1991
India MPs 1991–1996
India MPs 1996–1997
India MPs 1999–2004
India MPs 2004–2009
India MPs 2009–2014
Lok Sabha members from Uttar Pradesh
Members of the Cabinet of India
United Progressive Alliance candidates in the 2014 Indian general election
Civil aviation ministers of India
Commerce and Industry Ministers of India
Deaths from the COVID-19 pandemic in India